Stephen Walter Samarakkody (17 July 1919 - 1969) was a Sri Lankan politician. He was the member of Parliament of Sri Lanka from Polgahawela representing the Sri Lanka Freedom Party. 

He was elected to parliament from Polgahawela in the March 1960 general election and was re-elected in the July 1960 general election defeating D. B. Welagedara. He lost the 1965 general election to M. D. Banda.

Edmund Samarakkody and Siripala Samarakkody were his brothers, while Panini Ilangakoon and Robert Edward Jayatilaka were his brother-in-laws. He was married to Neeta Senanayake.

References

1919 births
1969 deaths
Members of the 4th Parliament of Ceylon
Members of the 5th Parliament of Ceylon
Sri Lanka Freedom Party politicians